Raj Khosla (31 May 1925 – 9 June 1991) was one of the top director, producer and screenwriter in Hindi film industry from the 1950s to the 1980s.  He was known for bringing in "neo-noir" and style in Indian cinema, and also as a "women's director" because he showcased actresses at their best. He has given many successful films with Dev Anand. Starting his career under Guru Dutt, he went on to make hit films like, C.I.D. (1956), Woh Kaun Thi? (1964), Mera Saaya (1966), Mera Gaon Mera Desh (1971), Dostana (1980) and Main Tulsi Tere Aangan Ki  (1978), which won the Filmfare Best Movie Award. His early background in classical music ensured that most of his films excelled in music.

Early life
Born in Rahon, Punjab, he was trained to be a classical singer. He came to Bombay to look for work as a singer while working in All India Radio for while as a music staff.

Film career
Soon Dev Anand felt he had other talents and hired him to be Guru Dutt's assistant on films, and eventually he became director.  His most famous films are C.I.D. (1956) (which introduced Waheeda Rehman to Hindi audiences and made her a star), Woh Kaun Thi? (1964) (which gave Sadhana her signature role of the "mystery girl"), Do Badan (1966) (which made Asha Parekh into a serious actress and won Simi Garewal the Filmfare Best Supporting Actress Award), Do Raaste (1969) (which made Mumtaz into a household name), Main Tulsi Tere Aangan Ki (1978) (which won Nutan the Filmfare Best Actress Award at a mature age).

On Dev Anand's advice to take up direction, he became Guru Dutt's assistant. His directorial debut Milap (starring Dev Anand and Geeta Bali) in 1954 didn't click at the box office. But his second film, C.I.D., released in 1956 set the ball rolling and the young director never looked back.

He was known for his excellent song picturizations, probably stemming from his musical background. Raj Khosla initially entered the Film Industry with hopes of making it as a playback singer. In most of his films he would have at least a song based on folk tune e.g. C.I.D., Bambai Ka Babu, Solva Saal, Mera Saaya, Do Raaste, Mera Gaon Mera Desh to name a few.

He assisted Guru Dutt and in 1954 got a break with Milap, starring Dev Anand and Geeta Bali. In this film, not only Raj Khosla made a debut as a Director, but a new Music Director, N. Dutta gave debut music.  Despite excellent music, the film failed to create waves. Fortunately, Khosla's second film produced for him by mentor Guru Dutt, C.I.D. (1956) propelled him into the big league. C.I.D. was a slick crime thriller that highlighted Khosla's stylish shot taking and innovative song picturization, something passed down from Guru Dutt.

From here onwards even as he continued to make films, Khosla ricocheted from style to style while adding his own touch to each genre. Never wanting to play safe Khosla made some films, which were startlingly different in those times. Solva Saal (1958) was a story of a single night wherein a girl elopes with her lover who dupes her and is helped back home by a journalist before her father wakes up and realizes what the girl has done. Bambai Ka Babu (1960) had the hero, a killer, entering the family of the man he has killed as their long lost son and falling in love with his "sister".

Khosla explored a variety of styles be it crime thrillers (C.I.D., Kala Pani (1958)), musicals (Ek Musafir Ek Hasina (1962) – whose starting point was seven songs composed by O. P. Nayyar), suspense thrillers (Woh Kaun Thi? (1964), Mera Saaya (1966), Anita (1967) – his mystery trilogy with actress Sadhana), melodramas (Do Badan (1966), Do Raaste (1969)) or dacoit dramas (Mera Gaon Mera Desh (1971) – which inspired Sholay (1975)).

He made films after Mera Gaon Mera Desh and had hits like  Prem Kahani (1975) starring the then hottest pair of the day Rajesh Khanna and Mumtaz, Nehle Pe Dehla (1976) and  Main Tulsi Tere Aangan Ki (1978)

In Main Tulsi Tere Aangan Ki, he evoked sympathy for the mistress even as he told the story from the wife's point of view. Khosla was a director who understood women and was known as a women's director much like George Cukor in Hollywood.

After enjoying big hits like Main Tulsi Tere Aangan Ki (1978) and Dostana (1980) with Amitabh Bachchan, Zeenat Aman and Shatrughan Sinha, Khosla ran into some rough weather as his other films started flopping. A dispirited Khosla took refuge in alcohol and died in Bombay on 9 June 1991, totally disillusioned with the film industry.

Legacy
After his death "The Raj Khosla Foundation" was established by his daughter Sunita Khosla Bhalla, with Shatrughan Sinha, as its chairman, and members like Manoj Kumar, Moushumi Chatterjee, Kabir Bedi, Mahesh Bhatt, Amit Khanna and Johny Bakshi.

Awards and nominations
Filmfare Nomination as Best Director – Do Raaste (1970)
Filmfare Nomination as Best Director – Main Tulsi Tere Aangan Ki (1978)
Filmfare Award for Best Film – Main Tulsi Tere Aangan Ki (1978)

Government recognition
A postage stamp, bearing his face, was released by India Post to honour him on 3 May 2013.

Filmography
 Director

 Producer
 Do Chor (1972)

References

External links
 

Film directors from Punjab, India
1925 births
1991 deaths
Hindi-language film directors
Artists from Ludhiana
Hindi film producers
Indian male screenwriters
Filmfare Awards winners
20th-century Indian film directors
Film producers from Punjab, India
20th-century Indian screenwriters
20th-century Indian male writers
Punjabi Hindus